Michael Clark II (born May 4, 1969) is an American professional golfer.

Clark was born in Kingsport, Tennessee. He attended Georgia Tech and turned professional in 1992. He won two events on the PGA Tour's official developmental tour in the 1990s, but it took him some years to win a place on the PGA Tour itself. His 2000 rookie PGA Tour season was a great success, with victory in the John Deere Classic and the PGA Tour Rookie of the Year award, but he struggled to build on this, and by 2005 he was back on the Nationwide Tour. Clark last played in a PGA Tour-sanctioned event in 2012.

Professional wins (3)

PGA Tour wins (1)

PGA Tour playoff record (1–0)

Nike Tour wins (2)

Nike Tour playoff record (0–1)

Results in major championships

Note: Clark never played in the Masters Tournament nor The Open Championship.

CUT = missed the half-way cut
"T" = tied

See also
1999 PGA Tour Qualifying School graduates

External links

American male golfers
Georgia Tech Yellow Jackets men's golfers
PGA Tour golfers
Golfers from Tennessee
People from Kingsport, Tennessee
1969 births
Living people